Curtis Luck (born 9 August 1996) is an Australian professional golfer from Cottesloe, Western Australia. In March 2017 he became the number one ranked amateur golfer in the world, heading the World Amateur Golf Ranking. He held that ranking before turning professional in April.

Golf career
Luck was runner-up at the 2014 Australian Amateur. He also won the 2016 Western Australian Open on the PGA Tour of Australasia.

Luck won the 2016 U.S. Amateur. He had previously planned to turn professional in October 2016, but decided to wait in order to retain his invitations in the 2017 Masters, U.S. Open and Open Championship. He moved from seventh in the World Amateur Golf Ranking to third with the win.

Luck was awarded the Emerging Athlete of the Year at the 2016 Australian Institute of Sport Performance Awards.

Luck later decided to turn professional at the 2017 Valero Texas Open, meaning he forfeited his U.S. Open and Open Championship exemptions.

In August 2020, Luck won the Nationwide Children's Hospital Championship in Ohio on the Korn Ferry Tour.

Amateur wins
2012 Newman and Brooks Junior Championship
2014 Victorian Junior Masters, New South Wales Medal, Western Australian Amateur
2016 U.S. Amateur, Asia-Pacific Amateur Championship

Source:

Professional wins (2)

PGA Tour of Australasia wins (1)

Korn Ferry Tour wins (1)

Results in major championships
Results not in chronological order in 2020.

CUT = missed the half-way cut
"T" = tied for place
NT = No tournament due to COVID-19 pandemic

Team appearances
Amateur
Eisenhower Trophy (representing Australia): 2016 (winners)

See also
2018 Web.com Tour Finals graduates

References

External links

Australian male golfers
PGA Tour golfers
PGA Tour of Australasia golfers
Korn Ferry Tour graduates
Golfers from Perth, Western Australia
1996 births
Living people